Giles Panton (born September 13, 1982) is a Canadian actor. He has worked in television, film, stage, and web media, and is also known for his voiceover work.

Career
Giles Panton trained as an actor at the William Davis Centre of Vancouver's VanArts (Vancouver Institute of Media Arts), graduating in 2005. He has also studied at acting studios in New York.

Panton is the voice of Keith, a lead character in Voltron Force, the 2011 animated series from Nicktoons, based on the 1980s Voltron animated saga.

He has appeared in many television shows and is known for playing the role of Joe Wylee, the police detective in the Flash Gordon television series. He also stars in the 2011 web series, Soldiers of the Apocalypse, playing the character of Twosev.

His first film was the 2005 short production, Bedridden. A later short film, On the Bus (2008) was presented at Oklahoma's Bare Bones International Film Festival in 2009.

Panton has also been active in Vancouver's alternate theatre scene. He was a headliner for Spectral Theatre Studio's 2009-10 season trio of paranormal plays, Deadends 666. And in 2006, he received the award for Best Performance by an Actor in a Supporting Role for his work in the I'm a Little Pickled Theatre Company production of The Book of Liz, by David Sedaris and Amy Sedaris.

In 2018, Panton joined the cast of The Man in the High Castle as Nazi Reich American Advertising Executive Billy Turner to work with Nicole Dõrmer to work to 'erase' any memory of the former U.S. from the minds of the citizens of the Nazi Reich America.

Filmography

Films
 Bedridden (short, 2005) — Jonathan
 Enough for Two (short, 2005) — James
 Shock to the System (2006) — Bartender
 Angelica's Pirate (short, 2006) — Black Breath Wally
 Balloon and the Beast (short, 2006) — Karl
 Happy Valentine's Day (short, 2006) — Mr. Elias
 Glimpse (short, 2007) — Man Full of Himself (voice)
 Class Savage (short, 2008) — The Hiker
 Nobody Special (short, 2008) — Giles
 Nomansland (short, 2008) — The Driver
 On the Bus (short, 2008) — Sean
 Damage (2009) — Rich Guy #2
 Voodoo (short, 2010–11) — Harold
 Sugar Babies (2015) — James
 Bad Date Chronicles (2017) — Brad
 Sleepwalking in Suburbia (2017) — Dan Miller
 My Favorite Wedding (2017) — Dex Richmond
 Christmas Pen Pals (2018) — Daniel Harrison
 It Was Always You (2021) — George

Television
 Legends of Tomorrow - Harris Ledes (Season 7) 2022 - 1 episode 
 Kingdom Force - (Season 2) 
 Kong: King of the Apes, 2018 — Lukas Remy (Season 2)
The Man in the High Castle, 2018 — Billy Turner (season 3)
 Chesapeake Shores, 2018 — Chris Smith (season 3)
 Tarzan and Jane, 2017–present — Tarzan (voice) (13 episodes)
 My Little Pony: Friendship Is Magic, 2017-18 — Flash Magnus (voice) (3 episodes)
 Reign, 2016 — Lord Cunningham (2 episodes)
 Nexo Knights, 2015-17 — Clay Moorington (voice) (40 episodes), Beast Master (voice), Burnzie (voice), The Blok (voice)
 Gin Tama, 2015-16 — Hitotsubashi Nobunobu (voice) (6 episodes)
 Cedar Cove, 2015 — John Bowman (season 3)
 Max Steel, 2014-15 — Ven Ghan (voice) (10 episodes)
 Voltron Force, 2011-12 — Keith (voice) (26 episodes)
 Smallville, 2010 — Agent (Episode: "Sacrifice")
 Human Target, 2010 — Roger (Episode: "Baptiste")
 V, 2009-10 — V Med Tech / V Nurse (3 episodes)
 Flash Gordon, 2007-08 — Joe Wylee (11 episodes)
 Intelligence, 2007 — Young Man (Dante's Inferno; Not a Nice Boy!)
LEGO Marvel Avengers: Climate Conundrum, 2020 - Tony Stark/Iron Man
 Ninjago, 2021 — Kalmaar (Seabound)

Videogames
 Dead Rising 4 (2016) — Darcy
 Far Cry 5 (2018) — Guy Marvel
 Bless Online (2018) — Lahhab Akheeman, Swen Radrillo, Gerin, Gentril, Lachoele, Mateo, Additional Voices
 NHL 19 (2018) — Ones Commentator
 Dragalia Lost (2018) — Joe, Kleimann

References

External links
 
 
 
 
 
 

1982 births
Living people
Male actors from Vancouver
Canadian male film actors
Place of birth missing (living people)
Canadian male television actors
Canadian male voice actors